A marine outfall (or ocean outfall) is a pipeline or tunnel that discharges municipal or industrial wastewater, stormwater, combined sewer overflows (CSOs), cooling water, or brine effluents from water desalination plants to the sea. Usually they discharge under the sea's surface (submarine outfall). In the case of municipal wastewater, effluent is often being discharged after having undergone no or only primary treatment, with the intention of using the assimilative capacity of the sea for further treatment. Submarine outfalls are common throughout the world and probably number in the thousands. The light intensity and salinity in natural sea water disinfects the wastewater to ocean outfall system significantly. More than 200 outfalls alone have been listed in a single international database maintained by the Institute for Hydromechanics at Karlsruhe University for the International Association of Hydraulic Engineering and Research (IAHR) / International Water Association (IWA) Committee on Marine Outfall Systems.

The world's first marine outfall was built in Santa Monica, United States, in 1910. In Latin America and the Caribbean there were 134 outfalls with more than 500 m length in 2006 for wastewater disposal alone, according to a survey by the Pan American Center for Sanitary Engineering and Environmental Sciences (CEPIS) of PAHO. According to the survey, the largest number of municipal wastewater outfalls in the region exist in Venezuela (39), Chile (39) and Brazil (22). The world's largest marine outfall stems from the Deer Island Waste Water Treatment Plant located in Boston, United States. Currently, Boston has approximately 235 miles of combined sewers and 37 active CSO outfalls. Many outfalls are simply known by a public used name, e.g. Boston Outfall.

Advantages 

The main advantages of marine outfalls for the discharge of wastewater are:
the natural dilution and dispersion of organic matter, pathogens and other pollutants
the ability to keep the sewage field submerged because of the depth at which the sewage is being released
the greater die-off rate of pathogens due to the greater distance they will have to travel to shore.

They also tend to be less expensive than advanced wastewater treatment plants, using the natural assimilative capacity of the sea instead of energy-intensive treatment processes in a plant. For example, preliminary treatment of wastewater is sufficient with an effective outfall and diffuser. The costs of preliminary treatment are about one tenth that of secondary treatment. Preliminary treatment also requires much less land than advanced wastewater treatment.

Disadvantages 

Marine outfalls for partially treated or untreated wastewater remain controversial. The design calculation and computer models for pollution modeling have been criticized, arguing that dilution has been overemphasized and that other mechanisms work in the opposite direction, such as bioaccumulation of toxins, sedimentation of sludge particles and agglomeration of sewage particles with grease. Accumulative mechanisms include slick formation, windrow formation, flocculate formation and agglomerated formation. Grease or wax can interfere with dispersion, so that bacteria and viruses could be carried to remote locations where the concentration of bacterial predators would be low and the die-off rate much lower.

Technology 

Outfalls vary in diameter from as narrow as 15 cm to as wide as 8 m; the widest registered outfall in the world with 8 m diameter is located in Navia (Spain) for the discharge of industrial wastewater. Outfalls vary in length from 50 m to 55 km, the longest registered outfalls being the Boston outfall with a length of 16 km and an industrial outfall in Ankleshwar (India) with a length of 55 km. The depth of the deepest point of an outfall varies from 3 m to up to 60 m, the deepest registered outfall being located in Macuto, Vargas (Venezuela) for the discharge of untreated municipal wastewater.

Outfall materials include polyethylene, stainless steel, carbon steel, glass-reinforced plastic, reinforced concrete, cast iron or tunnels through rock. Common installation methods for pipelines are float and sink, bottom pull and top pull.

Examples 

Submarine outfalls exist, existed or have been considered in the following locations, among many others:

Africa

 Casablanca (Morocco).
 Cape Town (South Africa).

Asia

 Manila Bay (Philippines).
 Mumbai (India).
 Mutwall ( Sri Lanka).
 Wellawaththa (Sri Lanka).
 Lunawa (Sri Lanka).

Oceania

 Anglesea, Victoria.
 Geelong, Victoria.
 Sydney
 
Europe

 Barcelona, Spain
 Costa do Estoril (Portugal)
 Marmara Sea near Istanbul (Turkey)
 San Sebastián (Spain)
 Split  (Croatia)
 Thames Estuary downstream of London (UK)
 Edinburgh, Scotland.

North America

 Honolulu (USA)
 New York Bight (USA)
 Southern California Bight (USA). and
 Victoria, British Columbia, (Canada).
 Santa Monica, United States (world's first) 
 Boston, United States (world's largest) 
The city of San Diego used Pacific Ocean dilution of primary treated effluent into the 21st century.

Latin America and the Caribbean

 Cartagena, Colombia
 Ipanema Beach beach from Rio de Janeiro (Brazil). This outfall, built in 1975, discharges untreated wastewater through a pipe with a diameter of 2.4m and a length of 4,775m at a depth of 27m.
 Sosua (Dominican Republic).

Controversies 

In the 1960s the city of Sydney decided to build ocean sewage outfalls to discharge partially treated sewage 2–4 km offshore at a cost of US$300 million. In the late 1980s, however, the government promised to upgrade the coastal treatment plants so that sewage would be treated to at least secondary treatment standards before discharge into the ocean.

The submarine outfall in Cartagena, Colombia was financed with a loan by the World Bank. It was subsequently challenged by residents claiming that the wastewater caused damage to the marine environment and to fisheries. The case was taken up by the World Bank's Inspection Panel, which contracted two independent three-dimensional modeling efforts in 2006. Both "confirmed that the 2.85km long submarine outfall (was) adequate."

For disposal into the ocean, environmental treaty requirements have to met. As international treaties often manage water over countries' borders, wastewater disposal is easier in bodies of water found entirely under the jurisdiction of one country.

References

Sources 

IWA Committee on Marine Outfall Systems
 Salas, Henry J.:Submarine outfalls a viable alternative for sewage discharge of coastal cities in Latin America and the Caribbean, Lima; CEPIS, 2000

External links 
 IAHR/IWA Committee on Marine Outfall Systems

Waste treatment technology
Environmental engineering
Hydrology
Hydraulics
Oceanography